Adrian Darnell Griffin Sr. (born July 4, 1974) is an American professional basketball coach and former player who is an assistant coach for the Toronto Raptors of the National Basketball Association (NBA). He played in the NBA as a shooting guard and small forward from 1999 to 2008. Griffin grew up in Wichita, Kansas and played collegiately at Seton Hall University.

Controversy

In August 2020, Griffin was publicly accused of domestic abuse by his former wife, Audrey Sterling. The Raptors took no action and conducted no investigation in regards to said allegations. Griffin started in August 2021 and ultimately abandoned a libel suit again Sterling in response.

College career
Griffin attended Seton Hall University and was a three-year starter. As a senior, he averaged 16.2 points, 8.3 rebounds, and 3.1 assists per game, and won All-Big East second team honors. In 2010, Griffin was inducted into the Seton Hall Athletics Hall of Fame.

Professional career
Griffin was not selected in the 1996 NBA draft. He spent the first three years of his career in the American minor leagues and in Italy (playing 8 games for Cordivari Roseto from July to October 1998). Griffin was selected to the All-Rookie First Team in 1997 while playing for the Connecticut Pride of the Continental Basketball Association. He was selected to the All-CBA First Team and All-Defensive Team with the Pride in 1998. Griffin led the Pride to the CBA championship in the 1998–99 season as he was named the Finals Most Valuable Player. He was also selected as the CBA Most Valuable Player and earned All-CBA First Team and All-Defensive Team honors.

Griffin began his National Basketball Association (NBA) career in 1999–2000 with the Boston Celtics. As a rookie, his averages were 7 points, 5.2 rebounds and 1.61 steals per game.

Over six seasons, he played for the Boston Celtics, Dallas Mavericks, Houston Rockets and Chicago Bulls, averaging 4.4 points, 3.3 rebounds and one steal per game. A career highlight was becoming a starter for the Dallas Mavericks in the 2006 NBA Finals.

After one season with the Mavericks, Griffin signed a three-year deal with the Chicago Bulls on July 17, 2006.

On February 21, 2008, Griffin was traded to the Seattle SuperSonics in an 11-player deal that involved players from the Chicago Bulls, Cleveland Cavaliers, and the SuperSonics.

On August 13, 2008, Griffin was traded to the Milwaukee Bucks in a three-team, six-player deal involving the Bucks, the Cleveland Cavaliers, and the Oklahoma City Thunder that also sent Milwaukee's Mo Williams to Cleveland, Cleveland's Joe Smith and Milwaukee's Desmond Mason to Oklahoma City, and Cleveland's Damon Jones and Oklahoma City's Luke Ridnour to Milwaukee.

Coaching career
Shortly after his playing career ended, he was hired by Milwaukee Bucks head coach Scott Skiles as an assistant, where he would work for the next two seasons.

On September 9, 2010, he became an assistant coach for the Chicago Bulls under Tom Thibodeau, where he coached for five years.

Along with working in the NBA, in 2014, Griffin accepted the offer to work with the USA coaching staff that helped win the Gold Medal in the 2014 FIBA World Cup. This team featured many NBA stars including: Stephen Curry, James Harden, and Kyrie Irving.

On June 26, 2015, he was hired by the Orlando Magic to be their top assistant coach.

On June 9, 2016, Adrian Griffin was hired by the Oklahoma City Thunder to be their lead assistant coach under head coach Billy Donovan.

On June 25, 2018, Adrian Griffin was hired by the Toronto Raptors to be the lead assistant coach under first-year head coach Nick Nurse. Griffin was an instrumental piece of the Raptors 2019 championship run, where the Toronto defeated the Golden State Warriors in 6 games of the 2019 NBA Finals, yielding Griffin his first championship ring. On April 10, 2022, Griffin served as the acting head coach for the Raptors' final game of the 2021-22 regular season against the Knicks.

Personal life
Griffin has completed his bachelor's and master's degrees from Seton Hall and is working on his doctorate in leadership studies. Griffin's son Adrian Jr. is a five-star recruit in the class of 2021 and was drafted 16th overall to the Atlanta Hawks in 2022. Griffin’s other son, Alan, played his first two college seasons at Illinois before transferring to Syracuse to continue his collegiate career.  His daughter, Aubrey, plays for UConn.

NBA career statistics

Regular season

|-
| align="left" | 
| align="left" | Boston
| 72 || 47 || 26.8 || .424 || .281 || .753 || 5.2 || 2.5 || 1.6 || .2 || 6.7
|-
| align="left" | 
| align="left" | Boston
| 44 || 0 || 8.6 || .340 || .346 || .750 || 2.0 || .6 || .4 || .1 || 2.1
|-
| align="left" | 
| align="left" | Dallas
| 58 || 34 || 23.8 || .499 || .296 || .837 || 3.9 || 1.8 || 1.3 || .2 || 7.2
|-
| align="left" | 
| align="left" | Dallas
| 74 || 48 || 18.6 || .433 || .250 || .844 || 3.6 || 1.4 || 1.0 || .1 || 4.4
|-
| align="left" | 
| align="left" | Houston
| 19 || 1 || 7.0 || .278 || .500 || .000 || 1.0 || .5 || .4 || .1 || .6
|-
| align="left" | 
| align="left" | Chicago
| 69 || 1 || 9.7 || .360 || .222 || .750 || 2.1 || .8 || .6 || .1 || 2.2
|-
| align="left" | 
| align="left" | Dallas
| 52 || 45 || 23.9 || .480 || .000 || .774 || 4.4 || 1.7 || 1.0 || .2 || 4.6
|-
| align="left" | 
| align="left" | Chicago
| 54 || 1 || 10.8 || .473 || .000 || .789 || 2.0 || 1.1 || .6 || .1 || 2.5
|-
| align="left" | 
| align="left" | Chicago
| 22 || 2 || 10.1 || .400 || .000 || .429 || 1.7 || 1.0 || .6 || .1 || 2.3
|-
| align="left" | 
| align="left" | Seattle
| 13 || 0 || 6.5 || .375 || .000 || 1.000 || 1.7 || .4 || .4 || .1 || 1.1
|- class="sortbottom"
| style="text-align:center;" colspan="2"| Career
| 477 || 179 || 16.8 || .438 || .278 || .763 || 3.2 || 1.4 || .9 || .1 || 4.0

Playoffs

|-
| align="left" | 2002
| align="left" | Dallas
| 4 || 1 || 14.3 || .588 || .000 || .000 || 2.3 || 1.0 || .5 || .2 || 5.0
|-
| align="left" | 2003
| align="left" | Dallas
| 15 || 2 || 8.7 || .415 || .333 || 1.000 || 2.9 || .5 || .3 || .0 || 2.5
|-
| align="left" | 2005
| align="left" | Chicago
| 5 || 0 || 17.2 || .517 || .000 || .800 || 4.0 || 1.8 || 1.0 || .0 || 6.8
|-
| align="left" | 2006
| align="left" | Dallas
| 20 || 8 || 17.5 || .542 || .000 || .875 || 3.6 || 1.2 || .8 || .1 || 3.6
|-
| align="left" | 2007
| align="left" | Chicago
| 4 || 0 || 2.3 || .000 || .000 || .000 || .3 || .0 || .2 || .0 || .0
|- class="sortbottom"
| style="text-align:center;" colspan="2"| Career
| 48 || 11 || 13.2 || .487 || .200 || .765 || 3.0 || .9 || .6 || .1 || 3.4

References

External links

1974 births
Living people
20th-century African-American sportspeople
21st-century African-American sportspeople
African-American basketball coaches
African-American basketball players
American expatriate basketball people in Canada
American expatriate basketball people in Italy
American men's basketball coaches
American men's basketball players
Atlantic City Seagulls players
Basketball coaches from Kansas
Basketball players from Wichita, Kansas
Boston Celtics players
Chicago Bulls assistant coaches
Chicago Bulls players
Connecticut Pride players
Dallas Mavericks players
Houston Rockets players
Milwaukee Bucks assistant coaches
Oklahoma City Thunder assistant coaches
Orlando Magic assistant coaches
Roseto Sharks players
Seattle SuperSonics players
Seton Hall Pirates men's basketball players
Shooting guards
Small forwards
Toronto Raptors assistant coaches
Undrafted National Basketball Association players